Lomonosov Group is a volcanic group of cinder cones located in the southern part of Paramushir Island, Kuril Islands, Russia.

See also
 List of volcanoes in Russia

References 
 

Paramushir
Cinder cones
Volcanic groups
Volcanoes of the Kuril Islands